Corporal Megan Leavey (born October 28, 1983) is a United States Marine Corps Veteran who served as a Military Police K9 handler.

Life and career
Leavey enlisted in the Marine Corps in August 2003 and completed recruit training at the Marine Corps Recruit Depot Parris Island in South Carolina. Afterwards, she attended and completed the Military Police school in San Antonio, Texas where she joined the K-9 program and was paired with a military working dog named "Rex" (E168) in October 2004. Leavey was stationed next at Camp Pendleton, California, assigned as a military police dog handler with the 2nd Military Police Battalion, II Marine Expeditionary Force (FWD).

The pair served two deployments in Iraq together, first to Fallujah in May 2005, and then to Ramadi in May 2006, where she and the German Shepherd were both wounded the following September by an improvised explosive device (IED) while she and her dog were leading a U.S. Army patrol down a street. Leavey was awarded the Purple Heart.

Leavey first sought to adopt Rex before she was honorably discharged from the Marine Corps in December 2007 with the rank of corporal. Four years later, when Rex developed facial palsy that ended his bomb-sniffing duties, Leavey again petitioned the Marine Corps for his adoption. In April 2012, "Sergeant Rex" was retired by the Marine Corps at Camp Pendleton's K-9 unit and Leavy and the dog were reunited through the intervention and support of Senator Chuck Schumer, Randy Levine (and his wife Mindy), president of the New York Yankees baseball club, and others. While living with Leavey, Rex died of old age in December 2012.

Leavey and Rex became the subject of the 2017 biographical film Megan Leavey. Leavey is portrayed by Kate Mara, and had a cameo appearance in the film as "Female Drill Instructor #3". In 2019, she was one of two recipients of the Genesis Legacy Medal which was presented to her by the National Purple Heart Honor Mission.

Military awards
Leavey received the following decorations and awards:

Other honors
 Leavey and Rex were honored during a pregame ceremony at Yankee Stadium on May 13, 2012.
 Leavey received Rockland County, New York's first annual "Freedom Award" on March 19, 2013.
 A new dog park "Clarkstown K-9 Corrals" was dedicated to Leavey and Rex (and the Clarkstown Police K-9's) at Congers Lake Memorial Park in Congers, New York, on September 21, 2018.

References

External links
 
 
 Nation K9 Veterans Day

1983 births
Living people
Female United States Marine Corps personnel
United States Marine Corps personnel of the Iraq War
People from Valley Cottage, New York
Military personnel from California
21st-century American women
United States Marine Corps non-commissioned officers